The organized system of Minnesota State Highways (typically abbreviated as MN or TH, and called Trunk Highways), the state highway system for the US state of Minnesota, was created in 1920 under the "Babcock Amendment" to the state constitution. No real pattern exists for the numbering of highways.  Route commissioning beyond these routes was by legislative action, thus the term legislative route. This included additions and revisions that took place when US and Interstate Highway Systems were commissioned.

Minnesota state highway markers use Type D FHWA font for all route numbers and type C for three-digit route markers only if type D font cannot be used.  All routes except interstates use  or  markers.  Interstate markers for three-digit routes are wider shields,  and  respectively.

Although Minnesota state highways do not follow a distinctive pattern in numbering, they are numbered to avoid conflicting with Interstate Highways and US Highways. Any instance of a state number that matches one is often a continuation of the particular route (e.g., U.S. Route 169 and Trunk Highway 169). The Minnesota Department of Transportation (MnDOT) does not consider this a violation of the rule.

List of highways

Other state highways 
Special routes

There are also routes officially numbered in the 805 and 905, but they do not have signage.  Examples include part of the Sibley Memorial Highway that was bypassed in Mendota in the mid 1995 (MN 913A, numbered for former designation MN 13), and Robert Street between I-494 and University Avenue in St. Paul and West St. Paul (MN 952, numbered for former designation US 52).

Other roads under Minnesota jurisdiction include the MN 371 Business Route, which follows the former route of MN 371 through Brainerd.  MN 23 also has a designated business route through the city of Willmar (as MN 23 is bypassed around the city), but unlike Business MN 371, Business MN 23 is under local jurisdiction.

Legislative routes defined in the Minnesota Constitution were signed until 1934, when many were renumbered. Several routes, like US Highway 208, were planned in the 1934 renumbering but eliminated before the final plan.

References

External links
MnDOT Roadway Data
The Unofficial Minnesota Highways Page, by Steve Riner
Twin Cities Highways, by Adam Froehlig

 
State highways